The Wife Has Left is a 1979 Soviet drama film directed by Dinara Asanova.

Plot 
The film tells about the Soviet family. The husband thought their life was perfect. His wife, in turn, was satisfied with his earnings. They had a baby. But the wife was unhappy and decided to leave.

Cast 
 Valery Priyomykhov as husband
 Elena Solovey as wife
 Mitya Savelyev
 Yekaterina Vasilyeva as Sonya
 Aleksandr Demyanenko as Stepan
 Lidiya Fedoseeva-Shukshina as Tanya
 Zinoviy Gerdt
 Natalya Bulgakova
 S. Ivanov as Yevgeniy Polyakov
 Valeri Karavayev as Viktor Izotov (as V. Karavayev)

References

External links 
 

1979 films
1970s Russian-language films
Soviet drama films
1979 drama films